The Architectural Association is a British institution in London.

Architectural Association may also refer to:

 Architectural Association of Ireland
 Architectural Association of Kenya
 Birmingham Architectural Association, UK
 Edinburgh Architectural Association and Inverness Architectural Association, chapters of the Royal Incorporation of Architects in Scotland

See also
Royal Institute of British Architects